Isabelle Eriksson (born 28 October 1986) is a Swedish athlete and host.

She has competed as a hurdler for IFK Lidingö and won the gold medal at the Swedish Athletics Championships in the 400 meter hurdles in 2011 as well as relay in 2013.

Eriksson has been involved in the political party Citizens' Coalition and later became host and reporter for the Sweden Democrats' media channel Riks in 2020.

References 

1986 births
Swedish female sprinters
Swedish female hurdlers
Living people